Hi-Fly is a studio album by American jazz pianist Horace Parlan, featuring performances recorded in 1978 and released on the Danish-based SteepleChase label. The album was produced using direct to disc recording and the CD reissue included alternate takes of all six tracks.

Reception 
AllMusic writer Ken Dryden gave the album 4 out of 5 stars and stated: "The ease with which Parlan and Raney handle 'Hi-Fly' over Little's walking bass is the mark of masters."

Track listing 
 "Hi-Fly" (Randy Weston) – 6:58  
 "'Round About Midnight" (Thelonious Monk) – 7:29  
 "Once I Loved" (Vinícius de Moraes, Ray Gilbert, Antônio Carlos Jobim) – 4:45  
 "Darn That Dream" (Eddie DeLange, Jimmy Van Heusen) – 7:02  
 "Who Cares?" (George Gershwin, Ira Gershwin) – 5:33  
 "West Coast Blues" (Wes Montgomery) – 4:44  
 "Hi-Fly" [alternate take] (Weston) – 6:36  Bonus track on CD reissue  
 "'Round About Midnight" [alternate take] (Monk) – 7:27  Bonus track on CD reissue    
 "Once I Loved" [alternate take] (DeMoraes, Gilbert, Jobim) – 4:49  Bonus track on CD reissue    
 "Darn That Dream" [alternate take] (DeLange, Van Heusen) – 6:53  Bonus track on CD reissue    
 "Who Cares?" [alternate take] (Gershwin, Gershwin) – 5:15  Bonus track on CD reissue    
 "West Coast Blues" [alternate take] (Montgomery) – 4:28  Bonus track on CD reissue

Personnel 
Horace Parlan – piano 
Doug Raney – guitar
Wilbur Little – bass

References 

SteepleChase Records albums
Horace Parlan albums
1978 albums